Opas is a surname. Notable people with the surname include:

 David Opas (1936–1980), Australian judge
 Pauli Opas (1929–2011), Finnish diplomat

See also